Carlos Rossi (born 25 October 1955) is a Chilean sailor. He competed in the Star event at the 1984 Summer Olympics.

References

External links
 

1955 births
Living people
Chilean male sailors (sport)
Olympic sailors of Chile
Sailors at the 1984 Summer Olympics – Star
Place of birth missing (living people)